USS Saratoga was a sloop in the Continental Navy. She was the first ship to honor the historic Battle of Saratoga. Having disappeared in 1781, her fate remains a mystery.
 
Saratoga was built at Philadelphia, Pennsylvania by Wharton and Humphries. She was begun in December 1779 and launched on 10 April 1780.

First cruise

Diplomatic escort
Commanded by Captain John Young, Saratoga departed Philadelphia on 13 August 1780 escorting the packet, Mercury, which was sailing for Europe carrying Henry Laurens. The former President of the Continental Congress was planning to seek money on the European continent to finance the American government.

Captain Young and Henry Laurens communicated with the frigates and they were to join Saratoga in a cruise as a squadron. The frigates, continued on up the Delaware River to replenish at Philadelphia.

After waiting in vain for the frigates to return, Saratoga and Mercury passed through the Delaware Capes out to sea by themselves. Because of inadequate ballast, the Saratoga was unstable under a heavy spread of canvas and was forced to proceed much more slowly than the Mercury. Thus, the Mercury was forced to heave to each night to allow the Saratoga to catch up. This schedule continued until 23 August, when Henry Laurens released the Saratoga from her escorting duty with the suggestion that she "...make a short cruise and then return to Philadelphia..." Afterwards, the unescorted Mercury was captured by the British off Newfoundland and Laurens was imprisoned in England.

Hunting off Delaware
For more than a fortnight, Captain Young operated east of the shipping lanes while he trained his crew in operating their ship and fighting her guns. On the afternoon of 9 September, a lookout spotted a sail to the northwest. By then, Young had managed to get Saratoga into fighting shape.

He headed his ship toward the unknown sail and set out in pursuit. By twilight, he was close enough to see that his quarry was a brig flying British colors. Some two hours later, Saratoga had closed within hailing distance and learned that the chase was the Royal Navy's brig, and not about to surrender. Saratoga opened fire with a broadside and was quickly answered by Keppel, opening an inconclusive, three-hour battle. During the action, due to gale force seas, coinciding with her insufficient ballast, the Saratogas guns were unable to inflict any serious damage on Keppel. After Captain Young’s repeated efforts to close to boarding distance of the Keppel and the British brig evading those efforts, and midnight approaching, Young ordered the helmsman to end the chase and head for home.

Capture of the Sarah
Three days later, as Saratoga approached Cape Henlopen, she came upon the Sarah, a British ship bound for New York laden with rum from the West Indies. The merchantman surrendered without resisting, and the two ships proceeded into the Delaware. They anchored off Chester, Pennsylvania, the following afternoon where the Sarah was promptly condemned and sold, along with her cargo, which brought the continental treasury funds desperately needed to refit the frigate, for sea.

Second cruise
The Saratoga spent three days at Chester, where she replenished her stores and took on additional iron for ballast before heading back down the Delaware toward the open sea and another cruise. She cleared the Delaware Capes on 18 September and sailed northward along the New Jersey coast. A week later, off the Jersey highlands, she came upon the Elizabeth, which had been taken in Chesapeake Bay several weeks before by British privateer, Restoration. The Saratoga captured the 60-ton American brig, and Captain Young sent the brig to Philadelphia under a prize crew.

Saratoga remained in the vicinity of the Jersey highlands without encountering any further ships. Toward the end of the month, she turned south. The Saratoga cruised parallel to the coast. Captain Young constantly exercised her crew at her guns and in her rigging to sharpen their fighting capability. The crew had an opportunity to prove their seamanship when on 10 October they safely brought their ship through a storm with but superficial damage. This same storm decimated the British squadron which Admiral Rodney had sent out of New York to patrol the American coast.

Capture of the Charming Molly
That night, she turned north again. At dawn the next day, she spotted two sails far off her port bow. The Saratoga was due east of Cape Henry when she began the chase. As she closed the distance between herself and her quarry, Captain Young ordered his helmsman to head for the open water between the enemy ships which proved to be the large, 22-gun letter of marquee ship, Charming Molly, and a small schooner, the Two Brothers. When the Saratoga was between the two English vessels, Captain Young ordered the Charming Molly to surrender, but she refused to do so. After the Saratoga had fired a broadside into the Charming Molly, a boarding party, led by Lt. Joshua Barney, leapt to the merchantman's deck and opened a fierce hand-to-hand fight which soon compelled the British captain to lower his colors.

An American prize crew under Lieutenant Barney promptly took the place of Charming Mollys British skipper, officers, and tars. Captain Young then set out after the fleeing sloop the Two Brothers which, when overtaken, surrendered without resistance. The second prize, Two Brothers, promptly headed for the Delaware for libeling in Admiralty court in Philadelphia.

Further prizes
From the prisoners captured on the Charming Molly, Captain Young learned that she and the Two Brothers had been part of a small merchant fleet which had sailed from Jamaica and had been scattered by the recent storm. As soon as his crew had finished temporary repairs to Charming Mollys battle-damaged hull, the Saratoga began to search for the remaining merchant fleet, a ship and two brigs. About mid-day on 11 October, a lookout saw three sails slowly rise above the horizon dead ahead, and another chase began. As the Saratoga approached the strangers, Captain Young ordered his helmsman to head between the ships. As she passed between the enemy vessels, she fired both broadsides, her port guns fired at the Elizabeth, and her starboard muzzles belched fire and iron at the brig Nancy. The enemy's shots passed above the Saratoga, causing only minor damage to her rigging while the first American salvo knocked the Nancy out of action and did substantial damage to the Elizabeth, which surrendered after taking another volley. Meanwhile, the other brig raced away; and Captain Young, being busy with his two new prizes, allowed her to escape free of pursuit.

The Saratoga's crew labored repairing the battered hulls of the prizes before sending them toward the Delaware Capes. About midnight, the Saratoga herself got underway northward. At dawn, near Cape Henlopen, a blue jacket sailor aloft reported seeing two unknown sails, one dead ahead and the other several miles off her port quarter. The first was later identified as American brig, Providence which was at that time a British prize heading for New York. The second ship was the 74-gun British ship-of-the-line, . Despite the proximity of the British man-of-war, Captain Young set out after the Providence and recaptured her after about an hour's chase. Captain Young quickly put a prize crew on board the Providence and then the Saratoga got underway for the Delaware. The Saratoga was anchored off Chester, Pennsylvania, at dawn on 14 October.

Cruise to the Caribbean
On 15 December, after being refitted at Philadelphia, the Saratoga got underway for Hispaniola to pick up a load of French military supplies which were awaiting transportation to America. New officers and men had come on board to replace those who had left the ship to man her prizes. A number of merchantmen awaited her just inside the capes hoping to be escorted to a safe offing. On the morning of 20 October, favorable weather enabled the Saratoga to put to sea escorting her 12 charges. The next afternoon, after one of the merchantmen signaled that an unknown sail had appeared, Saratoga set out to investigate. Within two hours, after seeing the British ensign flying from her mast, the Saratoga had reached within firing range and sent a warning 4-pounder shot across the stranger's bow. Instead of surrendering, the British privateer, Resolution, maneuvered to attack. The ships fired at the same instant, Resolutions gunners fired high and only did superficial damage to the Saratoga. The Saratogas broadside damaged the Resolutions hull and superstructure and forced her to surrender.

Captain Young embarked the Resolutions crew in Saratoga as prisoners; and placed an American crew on the prize. The two ships then headed toward Cape Henlopen which they reached on New Year's Day, 1781. Captain Young turned his prisoners over to the Continental agent at Lewes, Delaware, and headed the Saratoga back toward the Caribbean the same day.

On the morning of 9 January 1781, off the coast of then England's loyal province of East Florida, Saratoga captured the 20-gun letter of marque  in a fierce battle. Tonyn had recently sailed from St. Augustine laden with turpentine, indigo, hides, and deerskins intended for Liverpool England.

Captain Young spent a day repairing Tonyn and Saratogas rigging, then the two ships got underway on the morning of 11 January for Hispaniola. On the 16th, Saratoga captured, without resistance, the armed brig Douglas, which was carrying wine from Madeira to Charleston, South Carolina, that important Southern port which had fallen into British hands. Captain Young sent this prize to Philadelphia.

Escort duty and loss
On 27 January, the Saratoga and the Tonyn reached Cap-Français where Captain Young turned the Tonyn over to the French Admiralty court and arranged to have Saratoga docked to have her hull scraped and coated with pitch while awaiting the arrival of military cargo and French frigates to assist in convoying a fleet of Allied merchantmen. The little fleet departed Cap-Français on 20 February and returned eight days later with a British ship the Diamond, which they had captured as she approached Jamaica laden with plunder taken by the British during Admiral Rodney's conquest of the Dutch Island, St. Eustatius.

By mid-March, all was ready. The French warships were on hand; the Continental warships were loaded, and 29 heavily laden merchant ships were in the harbor awaiting escorts. The convoy left from Cap-Français on the 15th, the ides of March. Three days later on 18 March, a lookout high over the Saratogas deck reported two sails far off to westward, the Saratoga  left the convoy in pursuit of the strangers. About mid-afternoon, she caught up with one of the fleeing ships which surrendered without a fight. Captain Young placed an American crew on board the prize and got underway after the second ship. Midshipman Penfield, commander of the prize crew, later reported that as he was supervising his men's efforts to follow the Saratoga, the wind suddenly rose to fearful velocity and almost capsized his ship. When he had managed to get the snow-rigged merchantman back under control, he looked up and was horrified to learn that the Saratoga had vanished. After numerous successful victories and prizes, Saratoga disappeared, lost at sea. The Saratogas fate remains a mystery.

According to the U.S. Navy the ship was lost March 18, 1781, with all hands drowned, recorded as "86 less the prize crew."

References

Ships of the Continental Navy
Missing ships
Ships built in Philadelphia
1780 ships
Ships lost with all hands